The  Spokane Shock season was the sixth season for the franchise, and the second in the Arena Football League, coming off of their victory in ArenaBowl XXIII. The team was coached by Rob Keefe and played their home games at Spokane Veterans Memorial Arena. The Shock finished the regular season 9–9, qualifying for the playoffs as the 4th seed in the National Conference. They lost to the Arizona Rattlers in the conference semifinals, 33–62.

Standings

Schedule

Regular season
The Shock began the season on the road on March 11 against the San Jose SaberCats. Their home opener was against the Cleveland Gladiators on March 19. They visited the Jacksonville Sharks in their final regular season game on July 22.

Playoffs

Regular season

Week 1: at San Jose SaberCats

Week 2: vs. Cleveland Gladiators

Week 3: at Iowa Barnstormers

Week 4: vs. Kansas City Command

Week 5: BYE

Week 6: at Utah Blaze

Week 7: at Orlando Predators

Week 8: vs. Arizona Rattlers

Week 9: at Pittsburgh Power

Week 10: vs. Dallas Vigilantes

Week 11: vs. Tampa Bay Storm

Week 12: at Kansas City Command

Week 13: BYE

Week 14: vs. Philadelphia Soul

Week 15: vs. Chicago Rush

Week 16: at New Orleans VooDoo

Week 17: at Arizona Rattlers

Week 18: vs. Utah Blaze

Week 19: vs. San Jose SaberCats

Week 20: at Jacksonville Sharks

Playoffs

National Conference Semifinals: at (1) Arizona Rattlers

References

Spokane Shock
Spokane Shock seasons